Livadiakos Livadion was a Cypriot football club based in Livadia, Larnaca. Founded in 1971, was playing sometimes in the Third and Fourth Division.

At 2010 the team merged with Salamina Livadion to form Livadiakos/Salamina Livadion.

The club had also a futsal team from 2003 to 2014.

References

Association football clubs disestablished in 2010
Defunct football clubs in Cyprus
Association football clubs established in 1971
1971 establishments in Cyprus
Futsal clubs established in 2003
Futsal clubs in Cyprus